Pallippuram is a northern suburb of Trivandrum city of Trivandrum district, Kerala. It is one of the fastest urbanising area of the Trivandrum UA.Technocity is situated in this area.

Geography

Location
Pallippuram is located on National Highway 47, 7 km north of Kazhakkoottam.

Nearest airport is Thiruvananthapuram International Airport and nearest major railway station is Thiruvananthapuram Central. It is well connected to Thiruvananthapuram city by state road transport buses.

The headquarters of the Central Reserve Police Force(CRPF) camp in Kerala is at Pallippuram. Another CRPF camp is in Peringome, Payyannur.
The IG of the camp is K.V. Madhusudhanan==.

References

External links
 About Pallippuram

Villages in Thiruvananthapuram district